Chuma Emeka Uche Anene (born 14 May 1993) is a Norwegian footballer who plays as a striker.

Early life
Anene was born in Oslo to parents of Nigerian heritage, and grew up at the borough of Holmlia, and played at the same team as players like Mohammed Fellah, Ohi Omoijuanfo, Mathis Bolly, Adama Diomande, Haitam Aleesami and Akinsola Akinyemi.

Club career
Anene was brought to Vålerenga from Holmlia SK at the age of 16. He signed a professional contract at Vålerenga before the 2012 season, after making the debut in the 2011 season. He can play both as a striker and winger in Vålerenga's playing style. At 27 November 2011, he scored his first goal in Tippeligaen against Stabæk.

During the first half of the 2013 season, Anene played four matches for Vålerenga in the Tippeligaen. In August 2013 he joined Stabæk, then a second-tier team, on loan to the end of the season, with an option to buy. He scored a goal in his debut for Stabæk on 11 August 2013 when Strømmen was beaten 3–2. In 2014, he signed for Ullensaker/Kisa.

In the summer of 2015, he moved to the Russian Football Premier League side FC Amkar Perm. On 20 September 2015, on his Amkar debut, he scored a goal, helping his new club to reach a 1-1 away draw against the defending champions FC Zenit Saint Petersburg.

On 13 March 2017, Amkar Perm announced that Anene had left the club to join Kazakhstan Premier League side FC Kairat, with Kairat confirming the signing of Anene on a two-year contract two days later.

On 4 September 2018, Anene signed for Danish club FC Fredericia in the Danish 1st Division until the end of the year. But at the same time, he signed a pre-contract with Danish Superliga club FC Midtjylland when his contract at Fredericia expired. This deal was made as a strategy between two clubs with a good cooperation, because Midtjylland did not get to sign him before the transfer window closed, so they made Fredericia sign him for them, so he could join Midtjylland later. But despite joining Midtjylland on 1 January 2019, he stayed at FC Fredericia on loan for the rest of the season. On 29 March 2019, Midtjylland decided to recall him from Fredericia, and loan him out to Norwegian club FK Jerv.

In August 2019 he moved on loan to Crewe Alexandra, and made his first team debut coming on as a second-half substitute for Chris Porter in an EFL Cup second round tie against Aston Villa at Gresty Road on 27 August. He made his first start in a Crewe shirt on 3 September 2019 in an EFL Trophy tie against Burton Albion at Gresty Road, and scored his first league goal on 14 September 2019, against Cambridge United at Gresty Road. In November 2019, Anene was withdrawn from two games as a precaution following a head injury sustained at Northampton Town, returning in December to score five goals in three games, including two in a 5-1 Crewe win at Stevenage on 21 December.

International career
Anene has represented Norway at under-16, under-17, under-19 and under-20 level.

Career statistics

Club

References

1993 births
Footballers from Oslo
Norwegian people of Nigerian descent
Living people
Norwegian footballers
Norway youth international footballers
Association football forwards
Holmlia SK players
Vålerenga Fotball players
Ullensaker/Kisa IL players
Stabæk Fotball players
FK Rabotnički players
FC Amkar Perm players
FC Kairat players
FC Fredericia players
FC Midtjylland players
FK Jerv players
Crewe Alexandra F.C. players
Sandefjord Fotball players
Omonia Aradippou players
Eliteserien players
Norwegian First Division players
Macedonian First Football League players
Russian Premier League players
Kazakhstan Premier League players
Danish 1st Division players
English Football League players
Norwegian expatriate footballers
Norwegian expatriate sportspeople in North Macedonia
Expatriate footballers in North Macedonia
Norwegian expatriate sportspeople in Russia
Expatriate footballers in Russia
Norwegian expatriate sportspeople in Kazakhstan
Expatriate footballers in Kazakhstan
Norwegian expatriate sportspeople in Denmark
Expatriate men's footballers in Denmark
Norwegian expatriate sportspeople in England
Expatriate footballers in England
Norwegian expatriate sportspeople in Cyprus
Expatriate footballers in Cyprus